Juncus filicaulis, the thread rush, is a species of flowering plant in the family Juncaceae. It is native to southeastern Australia, and it has been introduced to New Zealand. A perennial reaching , it forms dense tufts.

References

filicaulis
Flora of New South Wales
Flora of Victoria (Australia)
Flora of Tasmania
Plants described in 1903